Parliamentary elections were held in Burkina Faso on 24 May 1992. They were the first parliamentary elections held in the country since 1978, and the first to be held under the 1991 constitution. The result was a victory for the Organization for Popular Democracy – Labour Movement, which won 78 of the 107 seats in the National Assembly.

Background
In 1991 President Blaise Compaoré had allowed some openings towards a multi-party system, various political parties (many of them in alliance with the President's Organization for Popular Democracy - Labour Movement, ODP-MT) were established. But opposition parties were not satisfied with the pace of reforms. They called on the formation a sovereign national conference, which would govern the country until the holding of elections. Compaoré refused to bow to this demand, and presidential elections were held in December (boycotted by the opposition, and held amid violent protests). The elections had initially been called for 9 January 1991, but were postponed until 1992.

Campaign
Between January and May 1992 the Coordination of Democratic Forces opposition coalition fell apart, with many of its constituents deciding to contest the elections. A total of 27 political parties eventually registered to compete in the elections, although only four had candidates in all provinces.

Conduct
According to international observers the elections were largely free and fair, whereas opposition parties claimed that there had been massive fraud.

Voter turnout was 33.8%, higher than the 25% participation in the presidential elections in 1991.

Results

The overwhelming majority of the elected MPs, 101 out of 107, were male. The new parliament had 17 teachers/school inspectors, 12 executives, 12 professors, 12 engineers, 5 physicians, 5 jurists, 5 economists and 5 businessmen, whilst the remaining 34 MPs belonged to other professional categories.

Aftermath
Following the elections, Youssouf Ouedraogo of ODP-MT became Prime Minister of the country. On June 20, 1992, a new seven-member cabinet was presented to the public.

References

parliamentary
Elections in Burkina Faso
Burkina
Election and referendum articles with incomplete results
May 1992 events in Africa